D1 Denby Darts is a bus route, operated by Team Pennine that runs between Denby Dale and Huddersfield via Clayton West, Skelmanthorpe and Kirkburton.

History 
In April 2019, two local councillors complained about the service, then numbered 233 and operated by Yorkshire Tiger, claiming that people are frustrated about the service and feel its fleet is outdated. From 25 July 2021, the route was rebranded as D1 Denby Darts, coinciding with the transfer of Yorkshire Tiger from Arriva to Transdev and its rebranding as Team Pennine.

Fleet
As part of the rebranding as D1, the route began being operated with refurbished Alexander Dennis Enviro200s.

Service
The route is operated by Team Pennine and runs between Denby Dale and Huddersfield via Clayton West, Skelmanthorpe and Kirkburton.

The route runs every 30 minutes on weekdays and Saturdays, and every hour on Sundays and public holidays.

References

Bus routes in England